Georges-Louis Arlaud (1869–1944) was a French photographer.

Gallery

France

Algeria

Nude

References

French photographers
1869 births
1944 deaths

External links